Colin Clarke is an English former professional rugby league footballer who played as a  in the 1960s and 1970s, and coached in the 1980s. He played at representative level for Great Britain, and at club level for Wigan (two spells), Salford and Leigh, and coached at club level for Wigan.

Playing career

International honours
Colin Clarke won caps for Great Britain while at Wigan in 1965 against New Zealand, in 1966 against France, and New Zealand, in 1967 against France, and in 1973 against Australia (3 matches).

Challenge Cup Final appearances
Colin Clarke played  in Wigan's 20–16 victory over Hunslet in the 1965 Challenge Cup final during the 1964–65 season at Wembley Stadium, London on Saturday 8 May 1965, in front of a crowd of 89,016.

County Cup Final appearances
Colin Clarke played , and scored a try in Wigan's 16–13 victory over Oldham in the 1966 Lancashire County Cup final during the 1966–67 season at Station Road, Swinton, on Saturday 29 October 1966, played  in the 15–8 victory over Widnes in the 1971 Lancashire County Cup final during the 1971–72 season at Knowsley Road on Saturday 28 August 1971, and played  in the 19–9 victory over Salford in the 1973 Lancashire Cup final during the 1973–74 season at Wilderspool Stadium, Warrington, on Saturday 13 October 1973.

BBC2 Floodlit Trophy final appearances
Colin Clarke played  in Wigan's 7–4 victory over St. Helens in the 1968 BBC2 Floodlit Trophy final during the 1968–69 season at Central Park, Wigan on Tuesday 17 December 1968, and played  in the 6–11 defeat by Leigh in the 1969 BBC2 Floodlit Trophy final during the 1969–70 season at Central Park, Wigan on Tuesday 16 December 1969.

Testimonial match
Colin Clarke's Testimonial match at Wigan took place in 1973.

Genealogical information
Colin Clarke is the father of the rugby league footballer who played in the 1980s and 1990s; Phil Clarke.

References

External links
!Great Britain Statistics at englandrl.co.uk (statistics currently missing due to not having appeared for both Great Britain, and England)
Statistics at wigan.rlfans.com
(archived by web.archive.org) Rugby League's Generation Game

1945 births
Living people
English rugby league coaches
English rugby league players
Great Britain national rugby league team players
Leigh Leopards coaches
Leigh Leopards players
Rugby league players from Wigan
Rugby league hookers
Salford Red Devils players
Wigan Warriors coaches
Wigan Warriors players